Sataspes tagalica, the brilliant carpenter-bee hawkmoth, is a species of moth of the family Sphingidae first described by Jean Baptiste Boisduval in 1875.

Distribution 
It is known from western and north-eastern India, Nepal, Myanmar, eastern and southern China and Thailand. The habitat consists of woodland margins and shady tracks through woodland, particularly near bodies of fresh water.

Description 
The wingspan is 56–70 mm. It is a variable species with several named forms. It is a mimic of Xylocopa carpenter bees, with males and females mimicking different species.

Biology 
It is a day-flying species. Adults are attracted to the flowers of Duranta erecta and Lantana camara.

The larvae have been recorded feeding on Dalbergia benthamii in Hong Kong.

References

Sataspes (moth)
Moths described in 1875